Limasawa, officially the Municipality of Limasawa (Cebuano: Lungsod sa Limasawa; Filipino: Bayan ng Limasawa),  is an island municipality in the province of Southern Leyte, Philippines. According to the 2020 census, it has a population of 6,191 people.

History
Within the Philippines, Limasawa is famed as the Mazaua mentioned by Antonio Pigafetta. This was the site of Ferdinand Magellan's initial landing in the area during the Victoria’s circumnavigation of the world. After his interpreter slave Enrique had spoken with the locals, Father Pedro de Valderrama performed the first mass in the Philippines on Easter Sunday 31 March 1521.

At the request of the residents of the island of Limasawa, the six barangays that comprise that island were detached and separated from the municipality of Padre Burgos through Presidential Decree No. 1549, signed by then President Ferdinand Marcos on June 11, 1978, and constituted as the Municipality of Limasawa. Limasawa completely became a municipality on August 27, 1989, after then President Corazon Aquino ordered the plebiscite which its residents voted in favor of the creation. The island, also known as Sarangani Island, is located south of Leyte, in the Mindanao or Bohol Sea.

Geography

Barangays
Limasawa is politically subdivided into 6 barangays.
Cabulihan
Lugsongan
Magallanes (Poblacion)
San Agustin (Tawid)
San Bernardo (Tigib)
Trianas

Climate

Demographics

Economy

See also 
 Butuan
 Dimasaua
 First Mass in the Philippines
 Ruy López de Villalobos

References

External links

 Limasawa Profile at PhilAtlas.com
ELGU Website of Limasawa
 [ Philippine Standard Geographic Code]
Philippine Census Information
Local Governance Performance Management System
Limasawa Island Information

Municipalities of Southern Leyte
Islands of Southern Leyte
Island municipalities in the Philippines
Establishments by Philippine presidential decree